Granitsiotis is a river in northwestern Evrytania, Greece. It is a tributary of the Acheloos. It flows through the village Granitsa.

External links
Granitsa, Evrytania

Landforms of Evrytania
Rivers of Greece
Rivers of Central Greece